Cycas annaikalensis is a Critically Endangered species of cycad in the genus Cycas, native to the state of Kerala in India, where it is endemic to the Annaikal Hills near Palakkad. It was discovered in 2006. There are less than 100 individuals remaining.

References

annaikalensis
Flora of Kerala
Critically endangered plants